University of Otago Faculty of Dentistry is one of the faculties of the University of Otago.

Founded in 1907, the Faculty of Dentistry is the only Faculty and School of Dentistry in New Zealand. It forms an integral part of the Division of Health Sciences within the University of Otago in Dunedin. It offers courses in all branches of dentistry, oral health therapy (formerly dental hygiene and dental therapy), and dental technology.

In addition to the undergraduate dental program, Otago offers specialty training programs combined with the Doctor of Clinical Dentistry (DClinDent) degree, advanced training programs, and research degrees including PhD and DDSc programs.

The Faculty has been ranked within the top 15 dental schools in the world by Quacquarelli Symonds since the introduction of its dentistry subject rankings in 2015.

Undergraduate programs
Bachelor of Dental Surgery (BDS)
Bachelor of Oral Health (BOH)
Bachelor of Dental Technology (BDentTech)

Graduate programmes
The Faculty of Dentistry offers formal graduate programmes leading to a Doctorate in Clinical Dentistry (DClinDent) in the following areas:
Biomaterials science
Community Oral Health & Epidemiology
Oral and Maxillofacial Pathology
Oral Medicine  (Offered conjointly with a medical degree from Otago Medical School)
Oral and Maxillofacial Surgery (Offered conjointly with a medical degree from Otago Medical School)
Orthodontics and Dentofacial Orthopaedics
Endodontics
Pedodontics
Periodontics
Prosthodontics

The Faculty offers Honours, Postgraduate Diploma, and Masters in Dental Technology, as well as Postgraduate Diploma in Clinical Dental Technology, and the Master of Oral Health.

History

In "A History of Dentistry in New Zealand" Brooking, (1980) has the origins of the profession of dentistry amongst barbers, pharmacists, blacksmiths, doctors and a number of other trades with the result being that a visit to the "dentist" was usually a gruesome experience. In an attempt to ensure a "standard of practice" the registration of "dentists" in New Zealand was introduced in 1880. In 1904 an Act of Parliament placed the education of dentists under the control of the University of New Zealand. A four-year Bachelor of Dental Surgery degree was introduced in 1907 with provision for 20 - 25 students. The first Dean was Dr H.P. Pickerill who achieved distinction for his research into dental caries and later as a plastic surgeon.

The first dental school building currently survives at the university's Staff Club. The second building, closer to the hospital and Medical School, became the Zoology building. While next door is the third, and current, building. A major revamp began in 2016, including demolition of the West Wing, its replacement by a new building, and complete refurbishment of the Walsh building.

The third Dean, Sir John Walsh strengthened the scientific and clinical base of the Dentistry by providing modern research facilities and introduced post-graduate programmes in the early sixties, when the Faculty moved into the third Dental School, later to be called the Walsh Building. Sir John was an advocate for water fluoridation in N.Z. but will be best remembered for his patent and construction of the a high speed air turbine handpiece (1949) which is very similar to the high speed handpieces in use today.

Accreditation
Otago University Faculty of Dentistry is accredited by the Dental Council of New Zealand and the Royal Australasian College of Dental Surgeons.

References

University of Otago
Dental schools
1907 establishments in New Zealand